Pospiech or Pośpiech is a Polish surname. It may refer to:

 Margaret Pospiech, Polish writer and filmmaker
 Paweł Pośpiech (1879–1922), Polish priest, activist and journalist

See also
 

Polish-language surnames